Henk Angenent (14 June 1930 – 26 December 1977) was a Dutch footballer. He played in one match for the Netherlands national football team in 1957.

References

External links
 

1930 births
1977 deaths
Dutch footballers
Netherlands international footballers
Place of birth missing
Association football forwards
SC Emma players
Fortuna Sittard players
HFC Haarlem players